Neuroplasticity is the second album by Cold Specks. "Absisto" is the album's first single. "Bodies at Bay" is the album's second single.

The album was a long-listed nominee for the 2015 Polaris Music Prize.

Track listing
 A Broken Memory
 Bodies at Bay
 Old Knives
 A Quiet Chill
 Exit Plan (featuring Michael Gira)
 Let Loose the Dogs
 Absisto
 Living Signs
 A Formal Invitation
 A Season of Doubt

References 

2014 albums
Mute Records albums
Arts & Crafts Productions albums
Cold Specks albums